John McCandless Thompson (January 4, 1829 – September 3, 1903) was a Republican member of the U.S. House of Representatives from Pennsylvania.

Thompson (brother of William George Thompson) was born near Butler, Pennsylvania.  He attended the common schools and Witherspoon Institute. He studied law, was admitted to the bar in 1854 and began practice in Butler.  He was a member of the Pennsylvania State House of Representatives in 1859 and 1860, and served one year as speaker.  He entered the Union Army during the American Civil War and served as major and subsequently as lieutenant colonel of the One Hundred and Thirty-fourth Regiment, Pennsylvania Volunteer Infantry.  He was a delegate to the 1868 Republican National Convention.

Thompson was elected as a Republican to the Forty-third Congress to fill the vacancy caused by the resignation of Ebenezer McJunkin.  He elected to the Forty-fifth Congress.  He was not a candidate for renomination in 1878.  He resumed the practice of his profession and died in Butler in 1903.  Interment in Butler Cemetery.

External links
, retrieved on February 15, 2008
The Political Graveyard
US Congressional Serial Set, 1913

1829 births
1903 deaths
Union Army officers
Republican Party members of the Pennsylvania House of Representatives
Republican Party members of the United States House of Representatives from Pennsylvania
19th-century American politicians